The 1893 Shamrock, built by the Mimna Brothers, is Canada's second oldest registered car and first internal combustion engine. The oldest car in Canada is the 1867 Henry Seth Taylor Steam Buggy built in Stanstead, Quebec.

History
William Mimna and his brother Charles were stonemasons who lived in the small town of Wardsville, located on the Thames River, north of Chatham, Ontario. The brothers began a quest to build their own automobile in 1893. William worked on the car in Wardsville, Ontario for many years on his own without much help from anyone else. In 1904 he finally finished his vehicle, and some speculation has been put into the year the vehicle should be placed in. However one Wardsville resident remembers the vehicle in its early years back in 1893, and thus the vehicle has been dated to that year.

The making of the car was originally inspired by steam locomotives, however William decided that gas-powered engines was going to rule the day in transportation so this is what he built. The car ran on one cylinder, put together from whatever parts the two brothers could find in Montreal, Hamilton, Toronto and Detroit, Michigan. Instead of a transmission the Shamrock had a system of belts and clutches helping it to run. The vehicle was named Shamrock the First, and without being aware of it the Mimna Brothers became a part of Canadian history.

Problems and competition from Henry Ford
Canada's first registered car and first internal combustion engine vehicle was not exactly successful however. The vehicle was unable to climb hills with its homemade engine, so the brothers decided to replace their engine with a French one, in hopes that it would have more power and be more efficient. However this did not help as the vehicle still would not climb hills or exceed 10 miles per hour, on level ground. In 1910, six years after completing the car, the brothers made some improvements by adding pneumatic tires and a steering wheel. By this time however Henry Ford was already mass-producing his own vehicle in Detroit. In 1893 Ford was promoted at the Edison Illuminating Company in Detroit to Chief Engineer giving him the time and money to devote his time to the creation and mass manufacturing of the automobile.

In 1914, the brothers had a renewed interest in the vehicle and built Shamrock the Second, from stock parts from other cars. This car was built exactly the same as the First but was faster. This speed was not such a positive thing however, especially with the lack of a proper braking system. William hit a cow in his hometown, and the car was thus totalled and never salvaged.

Today Shamrock the First rests at the Canadian Transportation Museum and Heritage Village, where it still runs. This museum is located in Kingsville, Ontario, just outside the Detroit-Windsor border, and is home to over 60 vehicles, covering all forms of Canadian automotive history.

References

Shamrock
Cars of Canada